Metopostigma is a genus of frit flies in the family Chloropidae. There are about nine described species in Metopostigma.

Species
These nine species belong to the genus Metopostigma:
 Metopostigma japonicum Kanmiya, 1978 c g
 Metopostigma limbipenne Meijere, 1913 c g
 Metopostigma nigriantennatum Kanmiya, 1978 c g
 Metopostigma nigritriangulum Kanmiya, 1978 c g
 Metopostigma pleskei Becker, 1910 c g
 Metopostigma polonicum (Schnabl, 1884) c g
 Metopostigma sabulona Becker, 1910 c g
 Metopostigma sauteri Becker, 1911 c g
 Metopostigma tenuiseta (Loew, 1860) c g
Data sources: i = ITIS, c = Catalogue of Life, g = GBIF, b = Bugguide.net

References

Further reading

External links

 

Chloropinae
Chloropidae genera